Abe Yeoman Wilson (1899 – 1981) was an American football offensive lineman who played in the  American Football League (AFL) and in the  National Football League (NFL). He played for the AFL's Los Angeles Wildcats (1926) and the NFL's Providence Steam Roller (1927–1929). Abe played college football for the University of Washington Huskies alongside his brother George Wilson. Wilson also coached at Washington in the 1925 season.

References

1899 births
1981 deaths
Sportspeople from Everett, Washington
American football offensive linemen
Los Angeles Wildcats players
Providence Steam Roller players
Washington Huskies football players
Washington Huskies football coaches